Lake of the Woods is a township in the Canadian province of Ontario, located within the Rainy River District. The township is located on the eponymous Lake of the Woods, consisting of mainland in the south-east part of the lake, the southern shores of Aulneau Peninsula, along with several islands in the lake, including Big Island and Bigsby Island. It fully surrounds the Anishnaabeg of Naongashiing, Big Grassy River 35G, Big Island Mainland 93, and Saug-a-Gaw-Sing 1 First Nation reserves.

The township was formed on January 1, 1998, when the former incorporated townships of Morson and McCrosson/Tovell were amalgamated. The following year portions of Unorganized Kenora District were annexed.

The primary communities within the township are Bergland, Minahico and Morson.

Demographics 

Notable people
John Elizabeth Stintzi, author

See also
List of townships in Ontario

References

External links

Municipalities in Rainy River District
Single-tier municipalities in Ontario
Township municipalities in Ontario
Lake of the Woods